Polička Vas is a settlement in the Slovene Hills in northeastern Slovenia. It lies in the Municipality of Pesnica. The area is part of the traditional region of Styria. The municipality is now included in the Drava Statistical Region.

References

External links
Polička Vas on Geopedia

Populated places in the Municipality of Pesnica